Takin' the Country Back is the seventeenth studio album by American country music artist John Anderson. It was released on July 29, 1997 as his first album for Mercury Records after leaving BNA Records in 1996. The album produced the singles "Somebody Slap Me", which peaked at 22 on Country charts, "Small Town", which peaked at 44, and the title track, which peaked at 41. Also included on the album is a cover of Van Morrison's 1967 hit "Brown Eyed Girl" from his album Blowin' Your Mind!.

Takin' the Country Back charted at 19 for country albums and reached 138 on the United States Billboard 200. Allmusic stated that it was "one of John Anderson's best latter-day efforts, thanks to his impassioned vocals and the clean, muscular production from Keith Stegall" despite "suffering" from "uneven material".

Track listing

Personnel
 John Anderson - lead vocals
 Eddie Bayers - drums
 Paul Franklin - steel guitar
 Brent Mason - electric guitar
 Hargus "Pig" Robbins - keyboards
 John Wesley Ryles - background vocals
 Joe Spivey - fiddle
 John Willis - acoustic guitar
 Glenn Worf - bass guitar

Chart performance

Album

Singles

References

1997 albums
Mercury Nashville albums
John Anderson (musician) albums
Albums produced by Keith Stegall